Acanthocinus pusillus is a species of longhorn beetles of the subfamily Lamiinae. It was described by William Kirby in 1837.

References

Beetles described in 1837
Acanthocinus